Puncak Alam is a township in Kuala Selangor District, Selangor, Malaysia.

Background
Previously developed from a palm estate holding of Felda (Federal Land Development Authority) within the locale of Bukit Cherakah, this township started its initial development during the late 1990s under the management of Bukit Cherakah Development Sdn. Bhd., a private company based in Shah Alam. Puncak Alam Housing Sdn. Bhd. later took over in 2001 as the principal developer of this township.

Eco Grandeur, LBS Alam Perdana and Hillpark is one of the new housing development in this area.

Future development
The same report projected that 65,798 additional units of houses/residences would be completed by the year 2015, capable of accommodating 350,000 population as compared to the current reported number of population of 25,000.

The latest Local Planning Masterplan for the year 2015 released by MPKS envision the addition of a water theme park and also a Light Rail Transit facility (linking Bestari Jaya, Puncak Alam and Shah Alam).

Amenities:
 Walking distance to Econsave and Alam Jaya Commercial Center shoplot
 7.7 km to UiTM Puncak Alam
 4 km to Masjid Puncak Alam
 2.8 km to School Puncak Alam, Petrol Station
 2.5 km to McDonald's, Tesco Puncak Alam
 17 km to Setia Alam

Access

Car
Puncak Alam is served by the Kepong-Kuala Selangor highway Federal Route 54.

Public transport
Puncak Alam is devoid of any rail transit services. The closest rail station is in  Kuang, 12 kilometres away. 

Bus services:
 rapidKL bus T715 (formerly T600) connects Puncak Alam to the UiTM campus in the township. 
 The UiTM campus also serves as a major bus interchange, with rapidKL bus route 753 (formerly U90) going to Setia Alam and Klang before terminating at the Shah Alam bus terminal in Section 14, downtown Shah Alam.
 Since 2018, there is a new Smart Selangor bus route KS02 connecting Puncak Alam to  Sungai Buloh MRT/KTM station. This route is a free service subsidized by the Selangor state government.

References

External links 
 Puncak Alam: A township that's nestled in nature Puncak Alam article in The Star newspaper
 www.BandarPuncakAlam.com Bandar Puncak Alam Information & Interaction Portal
 www.Kejiranan2B6.net Official portal for Phase 2B6 community, Shah Alam 2, Bandar Puncak Alam
 FORUM.BandarPuncakAlam.com Forum for Bandar Puncak Alam community
  Google map of Puncak Alam
  MDKS Development Plan for Bandar Puncak Alam
 Rancangan Tempatan MDKS Tahun 2015
 Majlis Daerah Kuala Selangor Majlis Daerah Kuala Selangor

Kuala Selangor District
Townships in Selangor